Santeri Alatalo (born May 9, 1990) is a Finnish-Swiss professional ice hockey defenceman who currently plays for HC Lugano of the National League (NL).

Playing career
Alatalo came through the youth ranks of Finnish team JYP. He moved to HPK youth program in 2007 and made his debut in the country's top-tier SM-liiga during the 2008-09 season. He helped HPK to a trip to the finals in 2010, where they were defeated by HC TPS.

Aatalo made his debut in the Swiss National League A (NLA) in the 2012–13 season with HC Davos after a mid-season transfer from HPK. On December 20, 2012, it was announced that Alatalo signed a two-year contract with NLA rivals EV Zug to begin the following season. In October 2014, he was handed a contract extension through 2017.

In 2020 Alatalo received a Swiss passport, and with it, he has the opportunity to represent the Swiss national team.

Alatalo won his first NL championship with EV Zug in May 2021.

On May 10, 2021, Alatalo agreed to a four-year deal with HC Lugano through the 2024–25 season.

Personal life
Alatalo's father Matti Alatalo is an ice hockey coach.

In 2020, Alatalo received Swiss citizenship.

Career statistics

Regular season and playoffs

International

References

External links

1990 births
Living people
HC Davos players
Finnish expatriate ice hockey people in Switzerland
Finnish ice hockey defencemen
HPK players
Ice hockey people from Tampere
Ice hockey players at the 2022 Winter Olympics
HC Lugano players
Olympic ice hockey players of Switzerland
SaPKo players
Naturalised citizens of Switzerland
Swiss people of Finnish descent
EV Zug players